John Andre Hanna (1762July 23, 1805) was a United States representative from Pennsylvania.

Biography
Born in Flemington in the Province of New Jersey, he received a classical education and graduated from Princeton College in 1782. He was a slaveholder.

He studied law, was admitted to the bar of Lancaster County, Pennsylvania in 1783 and commenced practice in Lancaster. He moved to Harrisburg and was admitted to the Dauphin County bar in 1785. He was a delegate to the State convention to ratify the U.S. Constitution in 1787, and was secretary of the anti-Federal conference in 1788.

Hanna was a member of the Pennsylvania House of Representatives in 1791, and was elected lieutenant colonel of the Third Battalion of Dauphin County on December 29, 1792. He was appointed brigadier general of Dauphin County Brigade on April 19, 1793 and was in command during the Whisky Rebellion of that year. He was appointed major general of the Sixth Division of Dauphin and Berks Counties on April 23, 1800.

Hanna was elected as a Democratic-Republican to the Fifth and to the four succeeding Congresses and served from March 4, 1797, until his death in Harrisburg in 1805; interment was in Mount Kalmia Cemetery.

Archibald McAllister, John Hanna's grandson, was also a U.S. Representative from Pennsylvania.

See also
 List of United States Congress members who died in office (1790–1899)

References

External links
The Political Graveyard

1762 births
1805 deaths
People from Flemington, New Jersey
People of colonial New Jersey
American people of Scotch-Irish descent
Democratic-Republican Party members of the United States House of Representatives from Pennsylvania
Members of the Pennsylvania House of Representatives
American slave owners
Politicians from Harrisburg, Pennsylvania
Politicians from Lancaster, Pennsylvania
Princeton University alumni
Burials at Harrisburg Cemetery